Annibali is a surname. Notable people with the surname include:

Domenico Annibali ( 1705–1779), Italian castrato 
Lucia Annibali (born 1977), Italian lawyer and politician

See also
 Annibale

Italian-language surnames